A web film is a film made with the medium of the Internet and its distribution constraints in mind. This term aims to differentiate content made for the Internet from content made for other media, such as cinema or television, that has been converted into a World Wide Web-compatible format. Web films are a form of new media.

Forms

There are broadly three forms of films that can be encountered on the Internet:

See also
Pluginmanifesto
Web series

References

External links
Ejemplos de Películas

Film and video terminology
Film and video technology
Internet films